Bapcha is a village and a panchayat in Dewas district in the Indian state of Madhya Pradesh. Bapcha is a major agricultural production area in Madhya Pradesh. It was earlier known as Harigarh.

References 

Villages in Dewas district